José Manuel Barbosa Alves (born 4 February 1990), known as José Coelho, is a Portuguese professional footballer who plays as an attacking midfielder.

Club career

Youth
Born in Paços de Ferreira, Coelho started his football career at hometown club F.C. Paços de Ferreira, then continued his formation with a further five years at FC Porto.

In 2006, he joined Inter Milan's Allievi Nazionali (under-17). He scored three league goals that season, ranking in the team behind Mario Balotelli (18 goals), Mattia Destro (nine) and Samuele Beretta (four) and also netting two of the six in the playoffs round as the club finished second in Group 1 (quarter-final), yet failing to qualify to the final.

In July 2007, Coelho was promoted to the Primavera Team, and played at the Champions Youth Cup in the following month. He finished his youth career at S.L. Benfica, staying there two years.

Professional
In summer 2009 Coelho, owned by Benfica, made his professional debut at his very first club Paços de Ferreira. His first official match was against another former team, Porto, in the 0–2 defeat for the Portuguese Supercup on 9 August. He made his first appearance in the Primeira Liga 20 days later in a 0–0 home draw against Vitória de Guimarães – on both occasions, he was brought from the bench.

In late July 2010, after only five overall appearances during the season, Coelho was loaned out again, this time to Segunda Liga's C.D. Fátima. He joined another club at that level, Atlético Clube de Portugal, for the following campaign on yet another loan.

In February 2012, Coelho terminated his contract with Benfica and signed for three years with FC Sheriff Tiraspol in Moldova. He returned to Portugal in the summer, however, to be close to his father who faced medical problems with two amputated legs; in early January 2013, after six months without a club, he joined second-tier side S.C. Freamunde.

References

External links

1990 births
Living people
People from Paços de Ferreira
Portuguese footballers
Association football midfielders
Primeira Liga players
Liga Portugal 2 players
Segunda Divisão players
F.C. Paços de Ferreira players
FC Porto players
S.L. Benfica footballers
C.D. Fátima players
Atlético Clube de Portugal players
S.C. Freamunde players
F.C. Penafiel players
F.C. Felgueiras 1932 players
S.C. Olhanense players
Moldovan Super Liga players
FC Sheriff Tiraspol players
Al Hala SC players
Liga 1 (Indonesia) players
Persela Lamongan players
Football League (Greece) players
OFI Crete F.C. players
Portugal youth international footballers
Portuguese expatriate footballers
Expatriate footballers in Italy
Expatriate footballers in Moldova
Expatriate footballers in Bahrain
Expatriate footballers in Indonesia
Expatriate footballers in Greece
Portuguese expatriate sportspeople in Italy
Portuguese expatriate sportspeople in Moldova
Portuguese expatriate sportspeople in Bahrain
Portuguese expatriate sportspeople in Indonesia
Portuguese expatriate sportspeople in Greece
Sportspeople from Porto District